Banksia baxteri, commonly known as Baxter's banksia or bird's nest banksia, is a species of shrub that is endemic to Western Australia. It has greyish brown bark, hairy stems, deeply serrated leaves with triangular lobes and lemon-yellow flowers in an oval flower spike that grows on the end of branches.

Description
The branchlets and leaves are densely covered with woolly, white hairs when young. Flowering occurs from December to May but mainly from January to March.

Taxonomy and naming
Banksia baxteri was first formally described in 1830 by Robert Brown in the supplement to his Prodromus. The type specimens were collected by William Baxter in the mountains near King George Sound in 1829.

In 1891, Otto Kuntze, in his Revisio Generum Plantarum, rejected the generic name Banksia L.f., on the grounds that the name Banksia had previously been published in 1776 as Banksia J.R.Forst & G.Forst, referring to the genus now known as Pimelea. Kuntze proposed Sirmuellera as an alternative, referring to this species as Sirmuellera baxteri. This application of the principle of priority was largely ignored by Kuntze's contemporaries, and Banksia L.f. was formally conserved and Sirmuellera rejected in 1940.

Distribution and habitat
Baxter's banksia grows with other shrubs such as Lambertia inermis, usually in deep sand and mostly occurs within  of the coast between East Mount Barren and Israelite Bay.

Conservation status
This banksia is classified as "not threatened" by the Western Australian Government Department of Parks and Wildlife.

Ecology
A 1980 field study at Cheyne Beach showed it to be pollinated by the New Holland honeyeater and white-cheeked honeyeater.

Banksia baxteri is serotinous, that is, it has an aerial seed bank in its canopy in the form of the follicles of the old flower spikes. These are opened with fire and release seed in large numbers, which germinate and grow after rain. Seed can last for many years; old spikes 9 to 12 years old have been found to have seed that remains 100% viable.

Use in horticulture
Seeds do not require any treatment, and take 21 to 42 days to germinate.

References

baxteri
Eudicots of Western Australia
Plants described in 1830
Endemic flora of Western Australia
Taxa named by Robert Brown (botanist, born 1773)